Clarice Taylor (September 20, 1917 – May 30, 2011) was an American stage, film and television actress. She is best known for playing Cousin Emma on Sanford and Son and the mother of Cliff Huxtable Anna Huxtable on The Cosby Show. and Mrs. Brooks in Five on the Black Hand Side (1973).

Biography

Born in Buckingham County, Virginia but raised in Harlem, New York, Taylor was best known for her recurring role on television on The Cosby Show as Dr. Heathcliff "Cliff" Huxtable's (Bill Cosby) mother, Anna Huxtable. She was nominated for an Emmy Award in 1986 for the role. She was also a regular on The Doctors in 1968 playing Hope Stark, Nurse as nurse Baily, Sesame Street as Grace, and appeared as Grady's cousin Emma on Sanford and Son.

Taylor started working in the theatre—with the American Negro Theatre—at a time when there were few opportunities for African-American actors and comedians. To support herself she followed in the footsteps of her father, Leon B. Taylor, Sr., and went to work for the U.S. Post Office. In the 1960s she got her big break that enabled her to act full-time. Taylor was one of the founding members of the Negro Ensemble Company, headquartered in New York's East Village on St. Mark's Place.

Film work
While working with the NEC she got her first offer of a movie role in Change of Mind (1969). Her next film role was as Minnie in Otto Preminger's Tell Me That You Love Me, Junie Moon (1970). In 1971, she played Birdie in Clint Eastwood's Play Misty For Me, and appeared as Mrs McKay in Such Good Friends the same year.
 
In 1973, she brought a role she had pioneered off-Broadway to film, playing Gladys Brooks in Five on the Black Hand Side. Her later films included Nothing Lasts Forever (1984), Sommersby (1993), and Smoke (1995). Two of her most well-known recurring characters in television were in Sanford & Son (1972), where she played Cousin Emma, and The Cosby Show (1984), where she played Anna Huxtable, Cliff's mother.

Stage
Taylor appeared in The Wiz as Addaperle, the Good Witch of the North, Purlie the Broadway play as Idella Landy. Her most recent performance was in a touring production of her one-woman show, Moms, for which she won an Obie Award in 1987 for best performance by an actress. Her last film appearance was a small role in Wayne Wang's film Smoke.

Death
Clarice Taylor died in Englewood, New Jersey from congestive heart failure, aged 93. She is survived by her two adopted sons, William and James Thomas, and extended family.

Partial filmography
The New Girl in the Office (1960)
Change of Mind (1969) - Rose Landis
Tell Me That You Love Me, Junie Moon (1970) - Minnie
Play Misty For Me (1971) - Birdie
Such Good Friends (1971) - Mrs. McKay
Five on the Black Hand Side (1973) - Mrs. Brooks
The Torture of Mothers (1980)
Nothing Lasts Forever (1984) - Lu
Sommersby (1993) - Esther
Smoke (1995) - Grandma Ethel

See also
 List of human characters in Sesame Street

References

External links
 
 

1917 births
2011 deaths
African-American actresses
American film actresses
American stage actresses
American television actresses
Actresses from New York City
Actresses from Virginia
Obie Award recipients
People from Buckingham County, Virginia
People from Harlem
Burials at Woodlawn Cemetery (Bronx, New York)
20th-century African-American people
21st-century African-American people
20th-century African-American women
21st-century African-American women